Rochester Zeniths is the name of:

Rochester Zeniths (basketball), a defunct professional basketball team that was based in Rochester, New York.
Rochester Zeniths (softball), a defunct professional softball team that was based in Rochester, New York.